The Wynnum-Manly Seagulls are an Australian rugby league football club based at Kougari Oval, in Brisbane's bayside suburb of Manly West, which neighbours the suburb of Wynnum. They competed in the Brisbane Rugby League from 1951 to 1997. Since 1996 they have competed in the Queensland Cup. Their jersey is red, green and white. From 1995 to 2005 they were known as the Wynnum Seagulls.

History
Wynnum-Manly first played in the Brisbane premiership in 1931, but withdrew from the competition after two seasons due to the Great Depression. After the war, the Seagulls re-entered the premiership in 1951 as the Wynnum-Manly District Rugby League Football Club. In the club's formative years from 1951 through to 1964 Jim Cloherty held the role of President. Before moving to their current home ground of BMD Kougari Oval in 1967, the club played at Kitchener Park. Kitchener Park remains the home of the Wynnum Manly Junior Rugby League Club.

Wynnum-Manly won only nine matches and drew one in their first three seasons, and it was widely thought they would disappear again in 1954 after they suffered numerous thrashings in first grade – including a 13–89 loss to Valleys when Norm Pope kicked nineteen goals – and forfeitures in the lower grades. "The Seasiders", as they were known then, improved from 1954 to 1959, when they achieved their first season with more wins than losses, defeated Valleys in the minor semi-final and provided their first international in Aboriginal winger Lionel Morgan. Morgan, when he made his test debut against France in 1960, became both the first international representative while playing with Wynnum-Manly and the first Aboriginal player to make a Test appearance.

However, from 1960 to 1980 Wynnum-Manly failed entirely to build upon the gains of the late 1950s. In that period they never finished higher than fifth in an eight-team competition, and were bottom no fewer than ten times. At the end of 1980, after thirty seasons since returning to the BRL, Wynnum-Manly had played 603 games for a win–loss–draw record of 173–415–14, corresponding to a success rate of a mere 29.90 percent. However, a speeding spree under president Arthur Lowell netted star North Queensland pair Gene Miles and Greg Dowling, and the Seagulls became a power for the first time, rising from four wins in 1980 to 14 (four more than the previous best) in the 1981 home-and-away season. The Seagulls won the Brisbane premiership in 1982, 1984, 1986 and 1995. They were runners up in 1985.

Wynnum Manly was the last non-NSWRL club to have one of its players chosen to debut for Australia when  forward Bob Lindner was selected to go on the 1986 Kangaroo tour. Lindner, who had made his State of Origin debut for Queensland in 1984, made his test debut against Papua New Guinea before the team embarked of its unbeaten tour of Great Britain and France. Also part of that undefeated tour which earned the team the nickname "The Unbeatables" were Wynnum Manly players Greg Dowling, Gene Miles, and Australian team captain Wally Lewis.

The BRL Premiership was succeeded by the Queensland Cup in 1996.

In 2006 Wynnum Manly started the 100.3 Bay FM live rugby league for the Wynnum-Manly Queensland Cup games. The commentators are Mike Higgison and former ABC radio personality Troy Robbins. In 2012 Wynnum-Manly went on to break their biggest win record by beating Central Caparas 84–6.

In the 2010 season, it was announced that Paul Green would become Wynnum's new coach. In 2011 after finishing 6th in the minor premiership and then defeating the minor premiers, Tweed Head Seagulls, twice during the final series, including the grand final. The Seagulls defended their premiership title in 2012, beating minor premiers Redcliffe in the grand final by 20–10.

No.		Position	Player
1		FB	
2		Wing	
3		Centre	
4		Centre	
5		Wing	
6	Australia	Five-Eighth Patrick Templeman
7	Australia	Halfback	Sam Scarlett
8	Australia	Front Row	Alex Barr
9	Samoa	Hooker	Kalolo Saitaua
10		FR

Representative honours

Australia
Lionel Morgan: 1960
Johnny Gleeson: 1963, 1964
John Wittenberg: 1963
Johnny Rhodes: 1975
Lew Platz: 1975
Gene Miles: 1982
Rod Morris: 1982
Colin Scott: 1983
Greg Dowling: 1984
Wally Lewis: 1984*
Bob Lindner: 1986

Wally Lewis who joined the club from Valleys in 1984, is the only Wynnum-Manly player to captain the Australia national rugby league team. Lewis captained the Kangaroos on 16 occasions while a member of the Seagulls from 1984-1987 including captaining the unbeaten 1986 Kangaroo tour of Great Britain and France. The 1986 Kangaroos, which included Greg Dowling, Bob Lindner and Gene Miles, earned themselves the nickname "The Unbeatables".

2022 Squad
Backs
Ben Farr
Brandon Jackonia
Caleb Daunt
Daine Spencer
David Mead
Deine Mariner
Delouise Hoeter
Falakiko Manu
Grand Hagai
Mathew Lyons
Max Plath 
Ryan O'Keefe
Sam Scarlett
Sebastian Winters-Chang
Sione Hopoate
Te Maire Martin
Tom Farr
Will Parslow

Forwards
Aaron Rockley
Bailey Hartwig
Ben Shea
Clayton Mack
Corey Jensen
Epel Kapinias
Harrison Graham
Jacob Sturt-Tobin
Jake Turpin
James Robinson
Kalolo Saitaua
Kelepi Faukafa
Lachlan Lee
Luke Bateman
Luke Gale
Matiu Love-Henry
Max Elliott
Nesta Meleisea-Watene
Nofoasa Malutoa
TC Robati
Tristan Hope
Zac Hosking
Shaun Packer

Personnel

Results

Sponsors

Major Partners 
 Wynnum Manly Leagues Club
 Brisbane Broncos

Premier Sponsors 
 Bartons Bayside
 International Sports Clothing
 Job Connect
 Lipke Motors
 SQS Haulage Pty Ltd
 Keid in Electrical

Platinum Sponsors 
 Optus
 QLS Group
 Ladbrokes
 Bendigo Bank
 Chemist Warehouse

Gold Sponsors 
 Elastoplast
 Signmart
 Yellow Cab Co
 Deadly Choices
 Redland City Council
 Pro Liquor
 Synergy
 Johnson
 Invilla

See also

National Rugby League reserves affiliations

References

Sources
 Wynnum Seagulls Statistics retrieved 7 February 2006
 Wynnum Seagulls Club Profile retrieved 7 February 2006

External links
 Official website
 QRL website Club Facts

 
Wynnum, Queensland
Manly, Queensland
Rugby clubs established in 1931
1931 establishments in Australia